David Brent is a fictional character in the BBC television mockumentary The Office, portrayed by the show's co-creator, co-writer and co-director Ricky Gervais. Brent is a white-collar office middle-manager and the principal character of the series. He is the general manager of the Slough branch of Wernham Hogg paper merchants and the boss of most other characters in the series. Much of the comedy of the series centres on Brent's many idiosyncrasies, hypocrisies, self-delusions and overt self-promotion.

Character 

Brent is presented as an employer who wholeheartedly believes that his employees love him, whereas in fact, apart from Gareth Keenan, they actually resent him. This is best noticed in the Series 1 finale, where Brent betrays his staff and accepts a promotion to higher management, saving his own skin from the inevitable downsizing that will befall the Slough branch as a consequence. Brent is later forced to turn the position down after failing a medical examination, but he insists to his employees that he failed it on purpose to save the branch.

Despite being the manager, Brent is totally spineless when it comes to confrontation. This is best seen through the character of Chris Finch, who Brent views unconditionally as his best friend despite his appalling attitude towards women and his many chances at ridiculing Brent as well as his staff. Brent's inability to stand up for himself or his staff members properly and professionally often results in him lashing out at his employees, pointing out their weight or age if his own is brought to ridicule.

In the second season, Neil Godwin, manager of the Swindon branch, is given Brent's promotion. Neil is shown to be everything that Brent is not, which provokes Brent's insecurity and jealousy. Neil effortlessly bonds with Brent's staff and earns their trust, perhaps best shown when a payroll issue is brought to Neil's attention, essentially going over Brent's head. Brent's dismissive attitude to key issues such as this culminates in a later confrontation with Neil and Jennifer when Brent fails to produce a report he promised to do. When given an official warning, Brent recklessly challenges Neil in an effort motivated by his hurt pride, stating that his removal from managing the Slough branch would result in a staff uprising. This however proves to be totally baseless, as when Neil and Jennifer announce that Brent will be made redundant, his staff are shown to be completely unconcerned and even relieved by the news.

Despite his unlikeable nature, Brent is not wholly perceived as insufferable. Instead, Brent is shown as the increasingly tragic figure of the series; a lonely man without any friends, goals or achievements who would rather please everybody around him even if it is met at his own expense. Of these key moments where sympathy is garnered for Brent, perhaps one of the most crucial scenes is when Brent begs Neil and Jennifer to reconsider firing him, after a secondary role as a motivational speaker falls through. 

In the Christmas special, Brent is working as a travelling salesman following his dismissal from Wernham Hogg, but he remains emotionally attached to his old workplace and constantly visits the office during working hours, eventually resulting in Neil banning him from the premises. He earns additional income on the side from Z-list celebrity appearances at various club nights trading on the minor fame the documentary series has given him, but he is frequently met with heckles and abuse from the crowds and gradually hits an emotional low. He is allowed to attend the Wernham Hogg Christmas party that ends the special, at which he meets a blind date who genuinely enjoys his company and says she would go out with him again. In higher spirits, Brent is later shown bonding with his former colleagues and finally succeeds in making them laugh when they take a group photo together.

Appearances outside The Office 
In 2002, Gervais wrote an in-character piece for the BBC website on "what makes a winner" of the FA Cup. He said, "Managing a Premiership football team is a bit like running a successful paper merchant. There's a lot of similarities. I have to pick the right team, I have to lead by example, I have to instil trust and discipline."

Gervais and Stephen Merchant (who co-created the show and the Brent character) put together two videos for Microsoft in the UK entitled The Office Values, in which Brent Brent is brought in as a motivational speaker. In the videos, Brent repeatedly shows a deep hatred for Bill Gates, at one point calling him a litterbug. Additionally, Brent plays a guitar song about the ills of technology versus the human condition, elaborates upon his desire for a comedy show (such as by impersonating Max Wall) and repeatedly makes fun of Jeff (Merchant's character), calling him a dweeb and a nerd for using the big word "erroneous". This culminates in an appraisal in which Jeff repeatedly insults Brent, calling him an idiot, ill-informed, ill-educated and a shaved baboon in a suit, among others.

Intended as internal training videos, the two videos were leaked online in August 2006 and Microsoft was reportedly unhappy about the leak.

At Wembley Stadium on 1 July 2007, Ricky Gervais performed as David Brent at the Concert for Diana. Alongside Mackenzie Crook as Gareth, Gervais performed a rendition of the song "Freelove Freeway" from episode four of The Office.

In 2009, Ricky Gervais appeared on Inside the Actors Studio, in which the host James Lipton asked if he could interview Gervais in character as David Brent for a brief period in the show. Gervais went on to perform a shortened version of the song "Freelove Freeway".

Brent made two brief appearances in the American version of The Office. In the season 7 episode "The Seminar", he meets his American counterpart Michael Scott (Steve Carell) while coming out of an elevator the latter is waiting for. Unsurprisingly, the two are seen to develop an instant rapport. David learns that Michael manages the Scranton branch of Dunder Mifflin (the paper company that is the equivalent of Wernham Hogg in the UK series) and asks if there are any jobs available there, but is told there are no openings at the moment. In the final episode of the same season, "Search Committee", Brent appears (via pre-recorded video resumé) as an interviewee for the Scranton manager's job, following the Michael Scott character's departure from the show several episodes earlier. In addition to appearing in the latter episode, Gervais contributed to the script.

In March 2013, the BBC broadcast a mini-episode called "The Office Revisited" for Comic Relief 2013, a charity fund-raising event.

After ten years, Gervais revived the character for his YouTube channel in the web series "Learn Guitar with David Brent." In each episode he plays the guitar, gives tips on how to play and answers fan questions. Among the songs he has played are "Freelove Freeway", "Spaceman", "Ooh La La" and "Life on the Road".

On 5 August 2014, it was announced that Gervais would reprise the role of Brent for a film titled David Brent: Life on the Road, which features the character as he tours the UK with his band Foregone Conclusion. The film was released in August 2016.

In August 2016, David Brent and Foregone Conclusion released the album Life on the Road. On 13 August 2016, Gervais appeared on the Dermot O'Leary show on BBC Radio 2 to publicise this album. Gervais was initially interviewed as himself and then after a short music interlude, O'Leary interviewed David Brent about the album release, and gave a stripped back acoustic session, playing the tracks "Life on the Road" and "Slough".

Influence
Dan Coop of the British band Does It Offend You, Yeah? has said that the name of the band came from a line spoken by David Brent, when he says, 'My drinking — does it offend you, yeah good?'

See also
 Michael Scott - Brent's equivalent in the US version of The Office.

References

External links 
david brent: renaissance man clips (requires RealPlayer)

Comedy television characters
Television characters introduced in 2001
Fictional English people
Fictional guitarists
Fictional managers
Fictional singers
British male characters in television
The Office (British TV series) characters